Daniele Degano (born 21 September 1982) is an Italian footballer who plays as a forward for ASD Potenza Picena.

Career
Degano played for Meda in the 1999–2000 season. The team had a friendly with F.C. Internazionale Milano in September 1999.

Monza
Since 2000 he played for Monza. In June 2001 he was signed by Parma along with Diego Daldosso, Massimo Ganci and Cristian Maggioni in co-ownership deal, for a total of 4 billion lire (1 billion lire each, or €516,457 each). In June 2002 Parma signed Degano and Maggioni outright and sold Daldosso and Ganci back to Monza.

Ancona
In August 2002 he moved to Ancona in new co-ownership from Parma to compensate the signing of Andrea Staffolani outright. Degano played for Ancona for  seasons.

Parma
In January 2004 he returned to Parma in a temporary deal. In June 2004 the co-ownership renewed in another year. However Ancona was declared bankrupted in 2004. In August 2004 he returned to Parma as free agent, with a handful playing time.

Piacenza
He was sold to Piacenza in January 2005, for €100,000. That window the club also signed former teammate Ganci.

Serie B clubs
In July 2007 he was signed by Messina for free in a 2-year deal. However the team also became bankrupt in July 2008 and all the players became free agents.

In August 2008 he was signed by another Serie B club Pisa, which the team also bankrupted after the season. In 2009, he moved to Pergocrema of the third division. In January 2010 he returned to Serie B again for Crotone.

Lega Pro
On 31 August 2010 he was transferred back to the third division for Cosenza.

On 23 August 2011 he was signed by Alessandria. On 31 January 2012 he moved to Rimini with Cristian Monac moved to opposite direction. Degano returned to Alessandria in July for the pre-season camp.

Serie D clubs
On 11 July 2015 he was signed by Fermana.

References

External links

 
 Football.it profile 

Italian footballers
A.C. Monza players
Parma Calcio 1913 players
A.C. Ancona players
Piacenza Calcio 1919 players
A.C.R. Messina players
Pisa S.C. players
U.S. Pergolettese 1932 players
F.C. Crotone players
Cosenza Calcio players
U.S. Alessandria Calcio 1912 players
Rimini F.C. 1912 players
Serie A players
Serie B players
Serie C players
Serie D players
Association football forwards
People from Crema, Lombardy
1982 births
Living people
A.C. Meda 1913 players
Sportspeople from the Province of Cremona
Footballers from Lombardy